Gloria is a dramatic comedy written by playwright Branden Jacobs-Jenkins focusing on the lives of working Americans and dynamics in the workplace.  The play made its debut Off-Broadway at the Vineyard Theatre in May 2015, after being developed by the same theatre. It was a finalist for the 2016 Pulitzer Prize for Drama.

Production history 
Gloria premiered Off-Broadway at the Vineyard Theatre on May 28, 2015 in preview, officially on June 17, directed by Evan Cabnet.  
 The artistic directors were Douglas Aibel and Sarah Stern, and the executive producer was Jennifer Garvey-Blackwell.  Set design was created by Takeshi Kata, costumes were designed by Ilona Somogyi, lighting was designed by Marr Frey and the sound was designed by Matt Tierney.  The play closed on July 18, 2015. A developmental workshop was held by the Vineyard Theatre in January 2013.

The Goodman Theatre produced the play, running from 14 January 2017 to 19 February 2017, directed by Evan Cabnet.

The play was performed at London's Hampstead Theatre 15 June to 29 July 2017

Gloria received its Australian premiere at the Melbourne Theatre Company's Southbank Theatre, opening on 21 June 2018, after six previews. It then enjoyed critical acclaim and a multi-extended season in Sydney, opening on 6 June 2019.

Gloria was performed by BA Acting students at the Royal Conservatoire of Scotland from 12 May 2022 to 14 May 2022, directed by Monique Touko.

Cast

Reviews 
The New York Times pointed out how "whip-smart satire of fear and loathing in a beleaguered industry under siege," and, "the cannibal culture cycles that grip and warp Americans’ attention these days," are portrayed in the play. The "New York Theater" review also credits the play with "providing more illumination into the characters, and raising some intriguing questions, such as the ugliness of artistic ambition, the ways we individually and as a society process trauma, the exploitation and corruption inherent in our commercial culture." The Hollywood Reporter also recognizes Jacob-Jenkins himself, as he "handles his serious themes in a thoughtful, provocative manner."

Awards and nominations
Gloria was a finalist for the 2016 Pulitzer Prize for Drama.

The play received nominations for:

2016 Lucille Lortel Awards
Outstanding Play 
Outstanding Featured Actress in a Play, Jeanine Serralles 

2016 Drama League Awards, Outstanding Production Of A Broadway Or Off-Broadway Play 

2016 Drama Desk Awards, Outstanding Featured Actress in a Play, Jeanine Seralles 

2016 Outer Critics Circle
Outstanding Director of a Play (The Lucille Lortel Award), Evan Cabnet
Outstanding New Off-Broadway Play

Original London production

References 

2015 plays
Comedy-drama plays
American plays
Plays set in New York City